This is a list of awards and nominations received by Michelle Williams.

Acting

NAACP Theatre Awards

Music

ASCAP Awards

ASCAP Pop Music Awards 
The American Society of Composers, Authors and Publishers (ASCAP) is a not-for-profit performance rights organization that protects its members' musical copyrights by monitoring public performances of their music, whether via a broadcast or live performance, and compensating them accordingly. Williams has received 4 awards from the company as a member of Destiny's Child.

ASCAP Rhythm & Soul Music Awards

BET Awards

GMA Dove Awards

GMWA Excellence Awards

Gospel Touch Music Awards
The Gospel Touch Music Awards are held annually in the United Kingdom to recognize gospel and inspirational music. Williams has one award.

Grammy Awards

The Grammy Awards are awarded annually by the National Academy of Recording Arts and Sciences. Williams has won 1 award from 7 nominations as a member of Destiny's Child, but each award is individually assigned to each member of the group.

NAACP Image Awards

The NAACP Image Awards is an award presented annually by the American National Association for the Advancement of Colored People to honor outstanding people of color in film, television, music and literature. Williams has received two nominations as a solo act.

NewNowNext Awards

MOBO Awards

The MOBO Awards (an acronym for Music of Black Origin) are held annually in the United Kingdom to recognize artists of any race or nationality performing music of black origin. Williams has won one award from two nominations.

Soul Train Awards

The Soul Train Music Awards is an annual awards ceremony that was established in 1987 to honor the best in African American music and entertainment. Williams has received one nomination.

Stellar Awards

The Stellar Awards is an annual awards show in the US, honoring Gospel Music Artists, writers, and industry professionals for their contributions to the gospel music industry. The Stellar Awards ranks high in status as the only gospel music television awards program syndicated in over 140 markets nationwide. Williams has been nominated five times and won one award.

References

Williams, Michelle